Colin Fraser (born July 27, 1978) is a Canadian politician, who was elected to represent the riding of West Nova in the House of Commons of Canada in the 2015 Canadian federal election. Despite winning by the largest margin in the riding's history, he did not seek re-election in the 2019 Canadian federal election.

Early life and education
Fraser was born in Yarmouth to Hugh Jon and Sharon Fraser. His father died of leukemia before Colin was 6. In 1996, he graduated from Yarmouth Consolidated Memorial High School and he then graduated from Carleton University in 2000 majoring in Political Science. He studied law in London, England and then graduated from Dalhousie Law School in 2007 with a Bachelor of Laws.

Legal career
He was a lawyer and partner at a Yarmouth firm until his election.

Political career
Elected in 2015, Fraser sponsored the private member bill, Bill C-311, which added the word legal to the Holidays Acts description of Remembrance Day.

Electoral record

References

External links
 Official Website

1978 births
Living people
Members of the House of Commons of Canada from Nova Scotia
Liberal Party of Canada MPs
People from Yarmouth, Nova Scotia
Carleton University alumni
Dalhousie University alumni
Lawyers in Nova Scotia
21st-century Canadian politicians